Near Death Experience is a 2014 French drama film directed, produced and written by Benoît Delépine and Gustave Kervern. It was selected to be screened in the Horizons section of the 71st Venice International Film Festival.

Cast 
 Michel Houellebecq as Paul
 Marius Bertram as tramp
 Benoît Delépine as colleague 
 Gustave Kervern as colleague 
 Manon Chancé as the driver

References

External links 
 

2014 films
2014 drama films
2010s French-language films
French drama films
Films directed by Benoît Delépine
Films directed by Gustave Kervern
2010s French films